The 2015 Unibet Masters was the third staging of the non-ranking Masters darts tournament, held by the Professional Darts Corporation (PDC). It was played between 31 January–1 February 2015 at the Arena MK in Milton Keynes, England.

James Wade was the defending champion, having beaten Mervyn King 11–10 in the 2014 tournament's final, but he lost in the quarter-finals to Gary Anderson.

Michael van Gerwen won his first Masters title by defeating Raymond van Barneveld 11–6 in the final, which he won with a tournament record average of 112.49 in the last game.

Qualifiers
The Masters only features the top 16 players in the PDC Order of Merit. These were:

  Michael van Gerwen (winner)
  Phil Taylor (first round)
  Gary Anderson (semi-finals)
  Adrian Lewis (semi-finals)
  Peter Wright (quarter-finals)
  James Wade (quarter-finals)
  Simon Whitlock (first round)
  Robert Thornton (first round)
  Dave Chisnall (quarter-finals)
  Raymond van Barneveld (runner-up)
  Mervyn King (first round)
  Brendan Dolan (first round)
  Ian White (first round)
  Andy Hamilton (first round)
  Terry Jenkins (quarter-finals)
  Wes Newton (first round)

Prize money
The total prize fund was £200,000.

Draw

References

Masters
Masters (darts)
Masters (darts)
Masters (darts)
Masters (darts)
Sport in Milton Keynes
2010s in Buckinghamshire